John Nepomucene Stariha (May 12, 1845 – November 28, 1915) was a Slovenian-born American prelate of the Catholic Church. He was the first Bishop of Lead, South Dakota, serving from 1902 to 1909.

Biography

Early life
John Stariha was born on May 12, 1845, in Semič in the Duchy of Carniola (present-day southeastern Slovenia), the son of John and Anna (née Judnic) Stariha. He received his early education in Novo Mesto but his studies were interrupted in 1866 when he was drafted into the Imperial Austrian Army. He served for seven months and took part at the Battle of Custoza on June 24, 1866. He was awarded a silver medal for bravery, but later deserted the army and fled to the United States.

He arrived in New York City in May 1867 and then headed west to Wisconsin. After briefly working as a farmhand to earn money, he was encouraged by his fellow Slovene and former schoolmate John Vertin to enter Saint Francis de Sales Seminary near Milwaukee. He completed his theological studies there, along with his brother and a cousin.

Priesthood
Stariha was ordained a priest by Bishop Ignatius Mrak on September 19, 1869, in Marquette, Michigan. His first assignment was as an assistant pastor at Saint Paul's Parish in Negaunee, Michigan, where he remained for two years.

Stariha came to the Diocese of Saint Paul in September 1871 and served for nine months in Marystown, Minnesota. In June 1872 he became pastor of St. Joseph's Parish in Red Wing and the surrounding missions. During his tenure, Stariha built a new church and opened a parochial school to accommodate the growing parish. He received a pardon from Austro-Hungarian Emperor Franz Joseph I in 1879 for deserting the army so that he could visit Slovenia.

Stariha remained in Red Wing until January 1884, when he was called to organize St. Francis de Sales Parish in Saint Paul, Minnesota for German-speaking immigrants. He built a church, rectory, parochial school, and convent during his time there. In addition to his pastoral duties, he was named vicar general of the Archdiocese of St. Paul and Minneapolis in December 1897.

Bishop of Lead
On July 21, 1902, Stariha was appointed by Pope Leo XIII to be the first bishop of the newly-created Diocese of Lead in South Dakota. The diocese covered the portion of South Dakota west of the Missouri River. Upon receiving the news, he told a Saint Paul newspaper: "The news that I had been made a bishop was wholly unexpected and came as a surprise to me...I have never craved for this position and if I can help it I will not go." Nevertheless, he received his episcopal consecration on the following October 28 from Archbishop John Ireland, with Bishops Joseph Cotter and James McGolrick serving as co-consecrators.

During his seven years as bishop, Stariha increased the number of priests in the diocese from 17 to 25 and the number of parishes and missions from 25 to 53. Due to poor health, he moved from his official residence in Lead to Hot Springs, South Dakota in 1908.

Retirement and legacy 
When his condition failed to improve, Stariha submitted his resignation as bishop of Lead on March 29, 1909, and it was accepted the following month. He was given the titular see of Antipatris by Pope Pius X.

Stariha retired to his native Slovenia in May 1909, residing in Ljubljana. John Stariha died from apoplexy on November 28, 1915, at age 70.

References

Catholic Church in South Dakota
Austro-Hungarian emigrants to the United States
1845 births
1915 deaths
Roman Catholic Archdiocese of Saint Paul and Minneapolis
Slovenian expatriates in the United States
Roman Catholic bishops of Lead
20th-century Roman Catholic bishops in the United States